Camille du Locle (16 July 18329 October 1903) was a French theatre manager and a librettist. He was born in Orange, France. From 1862 he served as assistant to his father-in-law, Émile Perrin, at the Paris Opéra. From 1870, he was co-director at the Opéra-Comique with Adolphe de Leuven, and sole director from 1874 to 1876. He is best remembered for mounting the original production of Bizet's Carmen in 1875.

Du Locle was responsible for completing the libretto of Giuseppe Verdi's Don Carlos (1867) after the death of Joseph Méry. He also played a key role in the genesis of Aida in 1869–70.

According to Charles Pigot, Du Locle inspired the subject, words and music of Bizet's Djamileh (1872). He was a pall-bearer at Bizet's funeral in 1875 and made a speech at his interment at Père Lachaise.

In 1876, a financial dispute arose with Verdi, and Du Locle moved to Capri, where he constructed and lived in the Villa Certosella, now a hotel. In Capri he was known for his reclusiveness, short temper, and sharp tongue. He often went around in a French suit, causing him to be regarded as a bit eccentric. One day he started attracting attention by wearing a suit and cape made of rough, uncoloured wool, a fabric usually only worn by fishermen. Soon many of the Germans and English on the island adopted attire made of similar material, which stimulated a local industry of hand-woven wool cloth which persisted until machine-made fabrics took over several decades later.

His friendship with Ernest Reyer led to him providing libretti for Sigurd (1884) and Salammbô (1890). 

Du Locle died in Capri in 1903.

Notes

Bibliography
 Budden, Julian (1985). Verdi. London: J M Dent & Sons. .
 Dean, Winston (1975). Bizet. Lond, Melbourne, and Toronto: J. M. Dent & Sons. .
 Huebner, Steven (1992). "Du Locle, Camille", vol. 1, p. 1272, in The New Grove Dictionary of Opera, four volumes, edited by Stanley Sadie. London & New York: Macmillan. .  (1998 paperback).
 Steegmuller, Francis, editor and translator (1982). The Letters of Gustave Flaubert: 1857-1880. Cambridge, Massachusetts: Harvard University Press. .

External links 
 Camille Du Locle on data.bnf.fr

1832 births
1903 deaths
French opera librettists
French theatre managers and producers
People from Orange, Vaucluse
French expatriates in Italy
French male dramatists and playwrights
19th-century French dramatists and playwrights
19th-century French male writers